Aaron Alexanther Codina Vivanco (born 19 February 1999) is a Chilean handball player for Polisportiva Cingoli, Italia and the Chilean national team.

He participated at the 2019 World Men's Handball Championship and at the 2021 World Men's Handball Championship

References

1988 births
Living people
Chilean male handball players
South American Games bronze medalists for Chile
South American Games medalists in handball
Competitors at the 2018 South American Games
21st-century Chilean people
20th-century Chilean people